Old Mutual Limited is a pan-African investment, savings, insurance, and banking group. It is listed on the Johannesburg Stock Exchange, the Zimbabwe Stock Exchange, the Namibian Stock Exchange and the Botswana Stock Exchange. It was founded in South Africa by John Fairbairn in 1845 and was demutualised and listed on the London Stock Exchange and other stock exchanges in 1999. It introduced a new strategy, called 'managed separation', that entailed the separation of its four businesses – Old Mutual Emerging Markets, Nedbank, UK-based Old Mutual Wealth and Boston-based Old Mutual Asset Management (OMAM) – into standalone entities in 2018. This led to the demerger of Quilter plc (formerly 'Old Mutual Wealth') and the unbundling of its shareholding in Nedbank. The business, which is now largely based in South Africa, provides sponsorship and supports bursaries at South African universities.

History

The company was founded in 1845 as a mutual insurance company by John Fairbairn, together with several other prominent Cape Town figures, such as the liberal politician Saul Solomon. The original name The Mutual Life Assurance Society of the Cape of Good Hope was changed to The South Africa Mutual Life Assurance Society in 1885.

In 1939, the Old Mutual art deco office opened in Darling Street as the Mutual Building ('Mutualgebou' in Afrikaans) which has since been converted to residential use and known as "Mutual Heights". In 1956, Old Mutual relocated its head office to Mutualpark in Pinelands, at that time the largest office block in the southern hemisphere.

Old Mutual acquired a major shareholding in the newly formed Mutual & Federal in 1970, acquiring the remaining shares in 2009. Mutual & Federal was renamed as Old Mutual Insure on 5 June 2017, and is now a part of the Old Mutual Emerging Markets business.

In 1973, Old Mutual acquired shareholding in Nedcor Bank (renamed the Nedbank Group in 2005).

In 1997 and 1998, the company acquired UK stockbrokers Capel-Cure Myers and Albert E. Sharp respectively, which then merged to form Capel-Cure Sharp.

By 1999, it was demutualised and the company listed on the London, Johannesburg, Zimbabwe, Malawi and Namibian Stock Exchanges as Old Mutual. Old Mutual also established a head office in London.

In 2000, it bought the Gerrard Group, a financial services concern, for $857 million. Capel-Cure Sharp subsequently merged with Greig Middleton, Gerrard Group's private client business. Old Mutual sold Gerrard to Barclays Bank plc in 2003.

Later in 2000, Old Mutual purchased United Asset Management, based in Boston, for US$1.46 billion in cash and assumed ownership of UAM net debt of around US$769 million, thus acquiring a large and diverse US-based asset manager. Among the holdings of UAM were the PBHG Funds of Pilgrim Baxter & Associates. In 2003, PBA was one of many companies who faced charges related to market timing brought by the U.S. Securities and Exchange Commission (SEC) and the Attorney General of New York. Ultimately, the PBHG Funds (renamed Liberty Ridge) were absorbed into the Old Mutual Funds group.

In 2005, Mike Levett retired as Chairman and was succeeded by Christopher Collins. In the same year a Black Economic Empowerment deal was introduced at Old Mutual South Africa, Nedbank and Mutual & Federal.

In 2006, Old Mutual acquired the Swedish insurer, Skandia, in a $6.5billion deal, bringing additional business in the United Kingdom, several other countries in Europe, Latin America, the Far East and Australia (that Old Mutual has since exited). Old Mutual also announced its Black Economic Empowerment deal in Namibia.

Patrick O'Sullivan became chairman of Old Mutual in 2010, succeeding Christopher Collins. The same year HSBC backed away from its plan to acquire 70% of Nedbank, including Old Mutual's 53% share. In 2011, Old Mutual sold US Life to Harbinger Group Inc. for $350 million.

Old Mutual sold its Nordic operations to Skandia Liv for £2.1 billion in 2012.

In 2013, Old Mutual strengthened operations in Africa with the acquisition of Provident Life Assurance in Ghana and Oceanic Life in Nigeria.

Also in 2013, Old Mutual acquired the Fairheads Trust Company, one of the oldest trust companies in South Africa, and established the Old Mutual Wealth Trust Company. Old Mutual Wealth Trust Company has two divisions: Old Mutual Wealth Fiduciary and the Old Mutual Wealth Family Office, that continues to work closely with the Fairheads Trust individuals and families with whom it has built relationships over the past 90 years. However, Old Mutual did not acquire Fairheads Benefit Services.

As of January 2014, with the additions of attorney Adiba Ighodaro, daughter of Nigeria's 3rd Secretary-General of the Commonwealth of Nations, Chief Emeka Anyaoku, and former Wall Street powerhouse Zoe Cruz, Old Mutual's Board became 30% female represented.

In 2014 Skandia Colombia was renamed to Old Mutual Colombia, Provident Life Assurance to Old Mutual Ghana and Skandia UK became Old Mutual Wealth. Later in 2014, Old Mutual Wealth sold Skandia Germany, Skandia Austria and Skandia Poland.

May 2015 saw Old Mutual celebrating 170 years of operations and Bruce Hemphill becoming Group Chief Executive in November.

In March 2016, Old Mutual plc announced a new strategy for the Group, called 'managed separation', that sought to unlock and create value for shareholders.  The strategy would entail the separation of its four businesses – Old Mutual Emerging Markets, Nedbank, UK-based Old Mutual Wealth and Boston-based Old Mutual Asset Management (OMAM) – into standalone entities. In August 2016, Old Mutual Investment Group signed a deal with the Nigeria Sovereign Investment Authority to invest $700 million in hospitality, retail, commercial sectors, and food security, and sold its Italian wealth management arm to the ERGO Group for €278 million.

A significant strategic milestone was reached during the first half of 2017 with the announcement of a series of transactions that would reduce Old Mutual plc's stake in OM Asset Management (OMAM) to 5.5%. OMAM is now independent from Old Mutual plc. Additionally, in 2017 Old Mutual completed the sale of Indian-based Kotak Mahindra Old Mutual Life Insurance Ltd.

The company announced in November 2017 that Old Mutual Wealth would be demerged as Quilter plc in 2018.

In June 2018 the company executed the 'managed separation' strategy. Old Mutual plc shares were de-listed and Old Mutual Limited and Quilter plc, now independent businesses, listed on the Johannesburg, Zimbabwe, Malawi, Namibian and London Stock Exchanges. On 15 October 2018, Old Mutual unbundled their majority shareholding in Nedbank, marking a distribution worth approximately R43.2 billion to Old Mutual shareholders, and the completion of Old Mutual Group's managed separation. Old Mutual's head office moved to No 1 Mutual Place, Sandton, Johannesburg in the same year.

In April 2019 the company sold its Latin American businesses to Lily Bermuda Capital, a wholly owned subsidiary of Singapore-based CMIG International Holding. This was followed in May by Peter Moyo being suspended as CEO due to "a material breakdown in trust and confidence between him and the board". Iain Williamson, previous COO, was appointed as acting CEO.

Operations
The structure of the business is as follows: 
Old Mutual South Africa 
Old Mutual Investment Group
Old Mutual Insure
Old Mutual Wealth (South Africa)
Old Mutual Botswana
Old Mutual Ghana
Old Mutual Malawi
Old Mutual Namibia
Old Mutual Nigeria
Old Mutual Swaziland
Old Mutual Zimbabwe
UAP Old Mutual Group
UAP Old Mutual Holdings
Faulu Microfinance Bank Limited
Old Mutual-Guodian (China)

Sponsorships
Old Mutual and its subsidiaries are involved in a number of sponsorships worldwide:

 The Old Mutual National Choir Festival (South Africa)
 The Old Mutual Soweto Marathon (South Africa)
 The Old Mutual Victory Race (Namibia)

Bursaries
Old Mutual South Africa awards a number of bursaries every year for exceptional matriculants and actuarial students at South African universities. It also offers partly qualified actuarial employees study leave before actuarial exams. Actuarial students are also typically awarded salary increases following exam passes.

Responsible business
Old Mutual participates in the United Nations Global Compact (UNGC), as well as the Carbon Disclosure Project.

Old Mutual Amazing Voices
Old Mutual Amazing Voices is a pan-African music competition reality television series produced by Destiny TV and launched by Old Mutual for DStv and M-Net's various local interest channels across Africa in their respective regions.

See also

References

External links

Official Old Mutual South Africa site

Companies established in 1845
Financial services companies established in 1845
Publicly traded companies
Companies listed on the London Stock Exchange
Companies listed on the Johannesburg Stock Exchange
Former mutual insurance companies
Insurance companies
Insurance companies of South Africa
Companies of South Africa
Companies of the United Kingdom
Insurance companies of the United Kingdom
Mutual organizations
Financial services companies based in London
Companies based in the City of London
Companies based in Johannesburg
1845 establishments in the Cape Colony